Wilfried Lange (22 February 1910 – 1993) was a German chess player, Chess Olympiad individual bronze medal winner (1952).

Biography
In his youth Wilfried Lange lived in Braunschweig, where he won the Lower Saxony chess championship in 1933. He later moved to Essen, where he won the city chess championships. In 1952, Wilfried Lange became the winner of the North Rhine-Westphalia Chess Championship. He won two national chess tournaments in Hamburg (1946, 1952). Between 1930 and 1950 he eight times participated in German Chess Championship. Wilfried Lange twice won German Chess Bundesliga with Essen Chess Club Essener SG 1904. In 1949 he received the title of German chess master.

Wilfried Lange played for West Germany in the Chess Olympiad:
 In 1952, at reserve board in the 10th Chess Olympiad in Helsinki (+3, =4, -3) and won  individual bronze medal.

After World War II Wilfried Lange has been invested many works in restoring German chess life. He was a member of the North Rhine-Westphalia Federal Chess Federation in the German Chess Federation. By profession Wilfried Lange was chemist.

References

External links

Wilfried Lange chess games at 365chess.com

1910 births
1993 deaths
Sportspeople from Riga
German chess players
Chess Olympiad competitors
20th-century chess players